Proceedings - Mathematical Sciences is a peer-reviewed  scientific journal that covers current research in mathematics. Papers in pure and applied areas are also published on the basis of the mathematical content. It is published by Springer Science+Business Media on behalf of the Indian Academy of Sciences. The editor-in-chief is Parameswaran Sankaran (Chennai Mathematical Institute).

History 
The journal was originally part of the Proceedings of the Indian Academy of Sciences. This journal was established in 1934, but in 1978 it was split into three different journals: Proceedings of the Indian Academy of Sciences – Mathematical Sciences, Journal of Earth System Science, and Journal of Chemical Sciences, all of them continuing as "volume 87". The journal was later renamed as Proceedings - Mathematical Sciences.

Abstracting and indexing 
The journal is abstracted and indexed in:

According to the Journal Citation Reports, the journal has a 2019 impact factor of 0.272.

References

External links 
 

Springer Science+Business Media academic journals
Quarterly journals
Publications established in 1978
English-language journals
Mathematics journals